Tavis is a given name. Notable people with this name include:

 Tavis Bailey (born 1992), American discus thrower
 Tavis Hansen (born 1975), Canadian ice hockey player
 Tavis Knoyle (born 1990), Wales rugby union football player
 Tavis MacMillan
 Tavis Ormandy, English computer security expert
 Tavis Smiley (born 1964), American talk show host and author
 Tavis Stanley, from Art of Dying (band)
 Tavis Werts, from Reel Big Fish